Austral Líneas Aéreas Flight 046 was an Argentine scheduled domestic flight from Buenos Aires to Posadas, via Resistencia, that undershot the runway at Libertador General Jose de San Martin Airport in Posadas on June 12, 1988, in conditions of poor visibility. All 61 passengers and crew on board were killed in the crash.

Accident sequence 
Flight 046, operated by a McDonnell Douglas MD-81, departed Buenos Aires' Aeroparque Jorge Newbery to Resistencia at 7:04 local time, and departed from Resistencia to Posadas at 8:40 after a 20-minute stopover. At 9:09, the crew of Flight 046 made radio contact with Posadas air traffic control, and 7 minutes later, the flight was cleared for an approach to Runway 01. Shortly after, the aircraft struck the top of a eucalyptus tree and crashed,  short of the runway. All on board perished.

Investigation 

The investigation into the disaster concluded that the main factor in the crash was that the crew attempted to land below the indicated minimum weather conditions for the instrument approach.

References

External links 

 Final Report (Archive)

Airliner accidents and incidents caused by pilot error
Aviation accidents and incidents in 1988
Accidents and incidents involving the McDonnell Douglas MD-81
Aviation accidents and incidents in Argentina
1988 in Argentina
June 1988 events in South America